Ahmed Reshid Habibu (born 11 December 1998) is an Ethiopian footballer who plays as a left-back for Bahir Dar Kenema F.C. and the Ethiopia national team.

References

1998 births
Living people
Sportspeople from Addis Ababa
Ethiopian footballers
Association football fullbacks
Ethiopia international footballers
2021 Africa Cup of Nations players
Ethiopian Coffee S.C. players
Dire Dawa City S.C. players
Bahir Dar Kenema F.C. players